= Hemmkurvenhindernis =

The Hemmkurvenhindernis was a German heavy steel barrier used during the Second World War. It was developed as a barricade against the armoured vehicles. It served as barricades on roads, bridges and beaches. It was also used in combination with other obstacles in defence lines.

== History ==
This barricade was a one the obstacles of the Atlantic Wall, it served during the Allied invasion of Normandy.

== Sources ==
- Obstacles on the Normandy battlefields
- TurboSquid - Hemmkurvenhindernis
